The Addis Ababa National Stadium will be a multi-purpose stadium, which can host football, rugby and athletics, in Bole, in eastern Addis Ababa, Ethiopia. It will be the national stadium of the Ethiopia national football team. The stadium will have a capacity of 62,000 and will be built by the China State Construction Engineering. While the stadium itself will cover 37 hectares, development is planned around it, spanning across 60 hectares.

The stadium includes CAF and FIFA preferences, enabling it to host international matches.

References

Athletics (track and field) venues in Ethiopia
Football venues in Addis Ababa
National stadiums
Multi-purpose stadiums in Ethiopia
Stadiums under construction